Lynette "Lyn" Bell (born 24 January 1947), also known by her married name Lynette Chipchase, was an Australian freestyle swimmer of the 1960s, who won the silver medal in the 4x100-metre freestyle relay at the 1964 Summer Olympics in Tokyo.

Coming from New South Wales, Bell spent the majority of her career in the shadow of fellow Australian Dawn Fraser. Making her debut in the 1962 Commonwealth Games in Perth, Bell was part of the winning 4x110-yard freestyle relay team, and placed 4th in the corresponding individual event.  Two years later in Tokyo, Bell was a finalist in the 100-metre freestyle, won by Fraser. She combined with Fraser, Robyn Thorn and Janice Murphy to finish second, 3.1 seconds behind the United States team.  At the 1966 Commonwealth Games in Kingston, Jamaica, she collected a silver in the 100-yard freestyle, as well as silver and bronze in the freestyle and medley relays respectively. Bell competed in the 1968 Summer Olympics in Mexico City, reaching the semifinal and final of the 100-metre and 200-metre freestyle events respectively. She finished fourth as part of the freestyle relay.

See also
 List of Olympic medalists in swimming (women)

References
 
 

1947 births
Living people
People from New South Wales
Australian female freestyle swimmers
Olympic swimmers of Australia
Swimmers at the 1964 Summer Olympics
Swimmers at the 1968 Summer Olympics
Swimmers at the 1962 British Empire and Commonwealth Games
Swimmers at the 1966 British Empire and Commonwealth Games
Olympic silver medalists for Australia
Commonwealth Games gold medallists for Australia
Commonwealth Games silver medallists for Australia
Commonwealth Games bronze medallists for Australia
Medalists at the 1964 Summer Olympics
Olympic silver medalists in swimming
Commonwealth Games medallists in swimming
20th-century Australian women
21st-century Australian women
Medallists at the 1962 British Empire and Commonwealth Games
Medallists at the 1966 British Empire and Commonwealth Games